In geometry, the rhombihexaoctagonal tiling is a semiregular tiling of the hyperbolic plane. It has Schläfli symbol of rr{8,6}.

Symmetry 
The dual tiling, called a deltoidal hexaoctagonal tiling represent the fundamental domains of *4232 symmetry, a half symmetry of [8,6], (*862) as [8,1+,6].

Related polyhedra and tilings 

From a Wythoff construction there are fourteen hyperbolic uniform tilings that can be based from the regular order-6 octagonal tiling. 

Drawing the tiles colored as red on the original faces, yellow at the original vertices, and blue along the original edges, there are 7 forms with full [8,6] symmetry, and 7 with subsymmetry.

See also 

 Tilings of regular polygons
 List of uniform planar tilings

References
 John H. Conway, Heidi Burgiel, Chaim Goodman-Strass, The Symmetries of Things 2008,  (Chapter 19, The Hyperbolic Archimedean Tessellations)

External links 

 Hyperbolic and Spherical Tiling Gallery
 KaleidoTile 3: Educational software to create spherical, planar and hyperbolic tilings
 Hyperbolic Planar Tessellations, Don Hatch

Hyperbolic tilings
Isogonal tilings
Semiregular tilings